Pseudebulea is a genus of moths of the family Crambidae.

Species
Pseudebulea fentoni Butler, 1881
Pseudebulea hainanensis Munroe & Mutuura, 1968
Pseudebulea kuatunensis Munroe & Mutuura, 1968
Pseudebulea lungtanensis Munroe & Mutuura, 1968

References

Natural History Museum Lepidoptera genus database

Pyraustinae
Crambidae genera
Taxa named by Arthur Gardiner Butler